Liolaemus cyaneinotatus is a species of lizard in the family Liolaemidae. It is endemic to Neuquén Province, Argentina.

References

cyaneinotatus
Reptiles of Argentina
Endemic fauna of Argentina
Reptiles described in 2011
Taxa named by Luciano Javier Ávila
Taxa named by Jack W. Sites Jr.
Taxa named by Mariana Morando